The 1994–95 OHL season was the 15th season of the Ontario Hockey League. The Newmarket Royals relocated, and became the Sarnia Sting. The OHL realigned from two divisions, creating the east, central, and west divisions. The Bumbacco Trophy is inaugurated to be awarded to the first place team in the west division, during the regular season. The Leyden Trophy is reallocated to the east division, and the Emms Trophy to the central division. Sixteen teams each played 66 games. The Detroit Junior Red Wings won the J. Ross Robertson Cup, defeating the Guelph Storm.

Relocation

Newmarket Royals to Sarnia Sting
The Newmarket Royals relocated to Sarnia and were renamed the Sarnia Sting after two seasons in Newmarket. The club was sold to the Ciccarelli brothers at the beginning of the 1993-94 season and were relocated to Sarnia for the 1994-95 season.

The club was originally the Cornwall Royals from 1969-1992, in which the franchise won the Memorial Cup three times. Following the 1991-92, the franchise was relocated to Newmarket. In two seasons in Newmarket, the Royals made the playoffs once, losing to the Sudbury Wolves in the first round of the 1993 playoffs.

The Sting will play at the Sarnia Arena and play in the newly created West Division.

Arena Renaming

London Gardens to London Ice House
The London Knights home arena, the London Gardens, was renamed to the London Ice House after the team and arena were purchased by new owner Doug Tarry. Tarry upgraded the building, including replacing seats and add more emergency exits to bring the building up to the fire code.

Realignment
The OHL announced realignment for the 1994-95 season, as the league would now have three divisions based on geographical location. The three new divisions were the East Division, Central Division and West Division.

East Division
Six teams from the Leyden Division would form the newly created East Division. The teams are: Belleville Bulls, Kingston Frontenacs, North Bay Centennials, Oshawa Generals and Ottawa 67's. The winner of the East Division will earn the Leyden Trophy.

Central Division
Five teams would make up the newly created Central Division, four teams from the Emms Division and one from the Leyden Division. The teams were: Guelph Storm, Kitchener Rangers, Niagara Falls Thunder, Owen Sound Platers, and Sudbury Wolves. The winner of the Central Division will be awarded the Emms Trophy.

West Division
Five teams would make up the newly created West Division, four teams from the Emms Division and one from the Leyden Division. The teams are: Detroit Junior Red Wings, London Knights, Sarnia Sting, Sault Ste. Marie Greyhounds and Windsor Spitfires. The winner of the West Division will earn the newly created Bumbacco Trophy.

Regular season

Final standings
Note: DIV = Division; GP = Games played; W = Wins; L = Losses; T = Ties; GF = Goals for; GA = Goals against; PTS = Points; x = clinched playoff berth; y = clinched division title; z = earned first round bye

East Division

Central Division

West Division

Scoring leaders

Playoffs

Division quarter-finals

East Division

(2) Oshawa Generals vs. (5) Peterborough Petes

(3) North Bay Centennials vs. (4) Belleville Bulls

Central Division

(2) Sudbury Wolves vs. (5) Kitchener Rangers

(3) Owen Sound Platers vs. (4) Niagara Falls Thunder

West Division

(1) Detroit Junior Red Wings vs. (4) London Knights

(2) Windsor Spitfires vs. (3) Sarnia Sting

OHL quarter-finals

(C1) Guelph Storm vs. (C3) Owen Sound Platers

(W1) Detroit Junior Red Wings vs. (E5) Peterborough Petes

(E1) Kingston Frontenacs vs. (E4) Belleville Bulls

(C2) Sudbury Wolves vs. (W2) Windsor Spitfires

OHL semi-finals

(C1) Guelph Storm vs. (E4) Belleville Bulls

(W1) Detroit Junior Red Wings vs. (C2) Sudbury Wolves

J. Ross Robertson Cup

(C1) Guelph Storm vs. (W1) Detroit Junior Red Wings

Awards

All-Star teams
The OHL All-Star Teams were selected by the OHL's General Managers.

First team
Jeff O'Neill, Centre, Guelph Storm
Dave Roche, Left Wing, Windsor Spitfires
David Ling, Right Wing, Kingston Frontenacs
Ed Jovanovski, Defence, Windsor Spitfires
Bryan Berard, Defence, Detroit Jr. Red Wings
Tyler Moss, Goaltender, Kingston Frontenacs
Craig Hartsburg, Coach, Guelph Storm

Second team
Marc Savard, Centre, Oshawa Generals
Larry Courville, Left Wing, Oshawa Generals
Todd Bertuzzi, Right Wing, Guelph Storm
Wes Swinson, Defence, Kingston Frontenacs
Jamie Rivers, Defence, Sudbury Wolves
Mark McArthur, Goaltender, Guelph Storm
Paul Maurice, Coach, Detroit Jr. Red Wings

Third team
Bill Bowler, Centre, Windsor Spitfires
Ethan Moreau, Left Wing, Sudbury Wolves
Vitali Yachmenev, Right Wing, North Bay Centennials
Rory Fitzpatrick, Defence, Sudbury Wolves
Brad Brown, Defence, North Bay Centennials
Matt Mullin, Goaltender, Sudbury Wolves
Stan Butler, Coach, Oshawa Generals

1995 OHL Priority Selection
The Barrie Colts held the first overall pick in the 1995 Ontario Priority Selection and selected Daniel Tkaczuk from the Mississauga Senators. Tkaczuk was awarded the Jack Ferguson Award, awarded to the top pick in the draft.

Below are the players who were selected in the first round of the 1995 Ontario Hockey League Priority Selection.

See also
List of OHA Junior A standings
List of OHL seasons
1995 Memorial Cup
1995 NHL Entry Draft
1994 in sports
1995 in sports

References

HockeyDB

Ontario Hockey League seasons
OHL